The Fenn Treasure was a cache of gold and jewels that Forrest Fenn, an art dealer and author from Santa Fe, New Mexico, hid in the Rocky Mountains of the United States. It was found approximately a decade later in 2020 in Wyoming by an anonymous treasure hunter later revealed to be former journalist and medical student Jack Stuef. In attempting to honor what he perceives to be Fenn's wishes after his death in September 2020, he has refused to reveal the location of the treasure. An auction of items from the treasure chest in December of 2022 resulted in $1.3 million in sales.

History 

Forrest Fenn (August 22, 1930 – September 7, 2020) was a pilot in the United States Air Force, obtaining the rank of Major. He was awarded the Silver Star for his service in the Vietnam War where he flew 328 combat missions in 365 days. He retired from the Air Force and ran the Arrowsmith-Fenn Gallery with his partner Rex Arrowsmith, which became the Fenn Galleries which he operated with his wife, Peggy. The gallery was located in Santa Fe, New Mexico, and sold a variety of Native American artifacts, paintings, bronze sculptures, and other art, including forged copies of works by Modigliani, Monet, Degas, and other artists. The gallery reportedly grossed $6 million a year.

In 1988, Fenn was diagnosed with cancer and given a prognosis that it was likely terminal. This inspired him to hide a treasure chest in an outdoor location with the purpose of creating a public search for it. He considered using the location as his final resting place as well. He recovered from the illness and in 2010 self-published The Thrill of the Chase: A Memoir, a collection of short stories from his life. He described a treasure chest that he said contained gold nuggets, rare coins, jewelry, and gemstones. He went on to write that he hid the chest "in the mountains somewhere north of Santa Fe". Fenn said that the stories in the book included hints to the chest's location and that the poem found in the chapter "Gold and More" contained nine clues that would lead a searcher to the chest. Fenn's book and story prompted a treasure hunt in the Rocky Mountains of New Mexico, Colorado, Wyoming, and Montana. The value of the chest was estimated to be as high as $2 million, depending on the appraisal of the items. In December of 2022, after the treasure had been found, an auction of items from the treasure chest resulted in $1.3 million in sales. Fenn claimed to make no money on the sale of the self-published books out of concern for being labeled a fraud by critics.

Before the treasure hunt, Fenn came into conflict with authorities over federal antiquities law during Operation Cerberus Action. Federal Bureau of Investigation (FBI) agents raided his home in 2009 as part of an investigation into artifact looting in the Four Corners area. Items in his possession reportedly included pieces of chain mail from the Pecos National Historical Park, human hair, a feathered talisman, and a bison skull, some of which were confiscated by federal authorities; no charges were filed. Two people targeted in the case committed suicide, and Fenn blamed the FBI for their deaths.

Fenn died on September 7, 2020, at the age of 90.

Deaths 
Five people died while searching for the treasure. This led the chief of the New Mexico State Police, Pete Kassetas, to publicly implore Fenn to end the treasure hunt, stating "He's putting lives at risk."

 Randy Bilyeu went missing in January 2016 and was found dead in July. His body was discovered by workers along the Rio Grande, and an autopsy could not determine cause of death. Bilyeu's ex-wife publicly stated her belief that the Fenn Treasure was a hoax.
 Jeff Murphy (age 53) of Batavia, Illinois, was found dead in Yellowstone National Park on June 9, 2017, after falling about  down a steep slope. Yellowstone officials did not provide details to the public concerning their investigation, but KULR-TV filed a Freedom of Information Act request. The television station reports that Murphy's wife told park authorities that he was looking for the treasure when she first reported him missing.
 Pastor Paris Wallace of Grand Junction, Colorado, told family members that he was searching for a buried treasure, but he failed to show up for a planned family meeting on June 14, 2017.
 Eric Ashby (age 31) was found dead in Colorado's Arkansas River on July 28, 2017. The raft overturned and Ashby had been missing since that time.
 Michael Wayne Sexson (age 53) of Deer Trail, Colorado, was found dead by rescuers on March 21, 2020, alongside his unnamed 65-year-old male companion, who later recovered in hospital (later named as Steven Inlow). Authorities were notified by the person who rented a pair of snowmobiles to the men. The pair were discovered within  of a site they had been rescued from a month earlier, near the Dinosaur National Monument along the Utah-Colorado border.

Controversy 

A number of notable controversies surrounded the treasure hunt. Several searchers were cited or arrested for committing legal infractions in the course of their pursuits. 
 			
 An unidentified man searching for the treasure was arrested in New Mexico in 2013 and charged with damaging a cultural artifact for digging beneath an iron cross of a descanso near the Pecos River.
 In April 2014, national park rangers detained Darrel Seller and Christy Strawn for having a metal detector and digging in Yellowstone National Park while searching for the Fenn treasure. On May 9, park rangers accused the couple of camping without a permit and starting a small fire.
 Scott Conway was cited by New Mexico State Parks officers after he dug a large hole on state land near Heron Lake while looking for the Fenn treasure.
 A Pennsylvania man, Robert Miller, was arrested for burglary, breaking and entering, and criminal damage to property in October 2018. Miller broke into Fenn's property and was hauling away a Spanish-style chest he thought was the treasure. He was caught in the act and held at gunpoint until law enforcement arrived.
 In December 2019, David Harold Hanson of Colorado Springs, Colorado, filed a lawsuit in U.S. District Court against Forrest Fenn. The lawsuit alleges Fenn made several fraudulent statements and deceived searchers. Although Hanson attempted to reopen it, the case was closed.
He was ordered to spend a week in jail and pay rescue costs of just over $4000. He received a five-year ban from the park. Disregarding Fenn's remarks that no climbing was required, Christensen remained convinced at his sentencing his solution was correct.

Treasure chest 
The treasure chest features a bronze construction with a wood liner and locking front clasp. The chest features scenes and reliefs with knights scaling walls on ladders and maidens above throwing flowers down upon them. This style of work appears to be references to the Le Roman de la Rose poem about the pursuit of love and scaling the "Castle of Love" which gained popularity around the same time the chest was made. Because of the popularity of the treasure hunt, artists have made modern recreations based on Fenn's chest.

Discovery 
On June 6, 2020, Fenn posted on the searcher blog Thrill of the Chase that the treasure had been found: <blockquote>"It was under a canopy of stars in the lush, forested vegetation of the Rocky Mountains and had not moved from the spot where I hid it more than 10 years ago. I do not know the person who found it, but the poem in my book led him to the precise spot. I congratulate the thousands of people who participated in the search and hope they will continue to be drawn by the promise of other discoveries. So the search is over. Look for more information and photos in the coming days."<ref>{{cite news |title='THE CHEST HAS BEEN FOUND!!!!... |url=https://dalneitzel.com/2020/06/06/important-advice-2/|website=dalneitzel.com |access-date=2020-06-07 |date=June 6, 2020}}</ref></blockquote>

This was subsequently confirmed by Fenn, who further disclosed in a news article that the finder was a male from the eastern United States who had sent him a photograph. The identity of the finder, the photograph, and the location of the treasure were not revealed. On June 16, Fenn released additional photos on the Thrill of the Chase blog site including of himself examining the contents of the chest and one of it sitting in weathered condition implicitly on or near the site where it was found. On July 22 Fenn stated on the Thrill of the Chase blog site that the treasure's finder had authorized him to disclose, in the interest of closure for many of its searchers, that it had been hidden in Wyoming.

In December 2020, Jack Stuef, a medical student from Michigan, revealed that he found Fenn's treasure chest and decided to disclose his identity by going public in an interview with Outside. Due to safety reasons he preferred to stay anonymous but a lawsuit was expected to reveal his identity.

Stuef revealed that two small items indicated in pre-find publicity were not present in the chest, a small gold frog on a necklace and a Spanish emerald ring found at San Lazaro. When Stuef notified Forrest about the missing items, Forrest located the frog within his collection and presented it to Stuef. However, Forrest was not able to find the missing emerald ring.

In July 2021, a French treasure hunter named Bruno Raphoz filed a $10 million lawsuit against Fenn's estate in the United States District Court for the District of New Mexico. According to the complaint, Raphoz had determined that the treasure was hidden in southwestern Colorado, informed Fenn of his solution, and began making preparations to retrieve it. However, his plans were delayed by the COVID-19 pandemic, and Fenn announced soon afterward that the treasure had been found in Wyoming. Raphoz contended that Fenn took advantage of the delay to move the chest from Colorado to Wyoming, noting that its exact final location has not been specified by Stuef or any of Fenn's relatives.

 In popular culture 
The Fenn treasure hunt has been featured in television shows, magazine articles, and books.

 Douglas Preston had seen Forrest Fenn's treasure chest long before Fenn hid it. It is credited as the inspiration for Preston's 2003 novel The Codex.
 The treasure hunt was featured in a 2015 episode of Expedition Unknown, "Finding Fenn's Fortune". Series host Josh Gates interviewed Forrest Fenn before joining several groups of treasure hunters as they searched multiple states in the Rocky Mountains.
 The Lure (2017) is a documentary feature film about the treasure directed by Tomas Leach.
 A 2018 episode of the web series Buzzfeed Unsolved: True Crime, "The Treacherous Treasure Hunt of Forrest Fenn", features the treasure hunt.
 On July 8, 2020, in an episode of Discovery Channel's Expedition Unknown: Uncovered taped prior to the treasure being found, Josh Gates tries to decode the clues of the poem.
 There have been a number of podcasts about Forrest Fenn and the treasure hunt. In June of 2022, Calvary Audio released the nine-part podcast series X Marks the Spot: The Legend of Forrest Fenn. The podcast is narrated by Branden Morgan and is executive produced by Dana Brunetti and Keegan Rosenberger. It was followed by the nine-part series Missed Fortune'', hosted by Peter Frick-Wright and released on Apple TV+ in August of 2022. Both series explore the history of Forrest Fenn and the treasure hunting community.

Books

References

External links 
 Old Santa Fe Trading Company, Forrest Fenn's web site and blog, which hosts a self-published "Thrill of the Chase Resource Page".

Puzzle hunts
Treasure of the United States